Delta-like protein 1 is a protein that in humans is encoded by the DLL1 gene.

Function 

DLL1 is a human homolog of the Notch Delta ligand and is a member of the delta/serrate/jagged family.  It plays a role in mediating cell fate decisions during hematopoiesis. It may play a role in cell-to-cell communication.

Interactions 

Delta-like 1 has been shown to interact with NOTCH2

References

Further reading